The Archeparchy of Mardin was a non-metropolitan Archeparchy of the Armenian Catholic Church, covering Turkey and Iraq.

History 
 1708: Established on territory split off from the Armenian Catholic Archeparchy of Cilicia.
 June 29, 1954: from its territory was established Armenian Catholic Archeparchy of Baghdad and Armenian Catholic Eparchy of Qamishli 
 1972: Suppressed and divided between the Armenian Catholic Archeparchy of Baghdad and Armenian Catholic Archeparchy of Istanbul.

External links
information on the archeparchy
Profile at Catholic Hierarchy 

Religious organizations established in 1708
Armenian Catholic eparchies
Armenian Catholic Church in Iraq
Armenian Catholic Church in Turkey
Religious organizations disestablished in 1972